Cystidiophorus is a genus of fungi in the family Polyporaceae. It is a monotypic genus, containing the single species Cystidiophorus merulioideus, known from Asia and eastern Russia. The genus and species were described in 1963.

References

Fungi of Asia
Fungi of Europe
Polyporaceae
Monotypic Polyporales genera
Taxa described in 1963